Polat is a Turkish name of Persian origin, meaning "steel". It may refer to:

Given name
 Polat Kemboi Arıkan (born 1990), Turkish long distance runner of Kenyan origin
 Polat Keser (born 1985), German–Turkish football player
 Polat Kocaoğlu (born 1979), Turkish basketball player

Surname

 Adnan Polat (born 1953), Turkish businessman and former president of the Galatasaray sports club
 Filiz Polat (born 1978), German politician of Turkish descent
 Lokman Polat (born 1956), Turkish-Swedish writer of Kurdish origin
 Mehmet Polat (born 1978), Turkish football player
 Uğur Polat (born 1961), Turkish actor

See also
 Bolad (given name)
 Polat Dam, a dam in Turkey
 Poladtuğay, a village in Azerbaijan

Turkish-language surnames
Turkish masculine given names